Ridley's leaf-nosed bat, Ridley's roundleaf bat, or Singapore roundleaf horseshoe bat (Hipposideros ridleyi) is a species of bat in the family Hipposideridae. It is found in Brunei, Malaysia and Singapore. Its natural habitat is subtropical or tropical swamps. It is threatened by habitat loss.

Taxonomy
Ridley's leaf-nosed bat was described as a new species in 1911 by Herbert Christopher Robinson and C. Boden Kloss. The holotype had been collected by English botanist Henry Nicholas Ridley in the Singapore Botanic Gardens in 1911.

Description
Its nose-leaf is very large and dark, covering its muzzle. The nose-leaf lacks lateral leaflets (smaller projections to the side).

Range and tatus
It is found in Southeast Asia where it has been documented in Brunei, Malaysia, and Singapore. Its habitat is lowland old-growth forest. Possibly, its range also includes Indonesia. As of 2020, it is evaluated as a vulnerable species by the IUCN.

References

External links
BioAcoustica: Sound recordings of Hipposideros ridleyi 

Hipposideros
Bats of Oceania
Bats of Southeast Asia
Bats of Indonesia
Bats of Malaysia
Mammals of Singapore
Mammals of Brunei
Mammals described in 1911
Taxa named by Herbert C. Robinson
Taxa named by C. Boden Kloss
Taxonomy articles created by Polbot